Princess Izabela Elżbieta Czartoryska (née Countess Morsztyn; 1671 – 1756) was a Polish noblewoman, known for her political salon and role in the  Familia party.

Life
She was the daughter of Jan Andrzej Morsztyn and Maria Katarzyna Gordon, and married Kazimierz Czartoryski in 1693. Through her daughter Konstancja she became the grandmother of king Stanisław August Poniatowski.

Along with her husband she supported Prince of Conti as a candidate to the Polish throne. In 1736 in Warsaw, she established the first political salon, where politicians met and the Familia party conferred.  Women played a significant role in those meetings.

References

1671 births
1756 deaths
Izabela Elzbieta
Nobility from Warsaw
Polish salon-holders
18th-century Polish women
Izabela Elzbieta
People of the War of the Polish Succession
18th-century Polish nobility